Comedy Central is an Italian television channel broadcasting comedy-related programmes from the United States, the United Kingdom and Italy. It is owned by Paramount Networks EMEAA.

Programming

Shows
 Amici @ Letto
 Lo Zoo di 105 (recorded from Radio 105 Network)
 Bastardi
 Second Italy
 Neurovisione
 Amici miei
 The Daily Show with Jon Stewart
 Very Victoria
 The Ben Stiller Show
 Markette (from La7)
 Crozza Italia (from La7)
 Made in Sud
 Comedy Tour
 Comicittà
 The Sarah Silverman Program
 Central Station
 Salsa Rosa

Cartoons
 Drawn Together
 South Park
 Odd Job Jack
 The Boondocks
 Beavis and Butt-head
 Comedy Illustrated (ILL-ustrated)
 Fuori di Zukka (Free For All)
 Interviste mai Viste (Creature Comforts)
 Happy Tree Friends (TV series)
 SpongeBob SquarePants from 2007
Sitcoms
 Porno: Un Affare di Famiglia (Family Business)
 Le Regole dell'Amore (Rules of Engagement)
 Medici Senza Speranza (Out of Practice)
 Courting Alex The Comeback Frasier Love, Inc. So Notorious Normal, Ohio Tutti Amano Raymond (Everybody Loves Raymond)
 Almost Perfect Becker The King of QueensTV series
 Sex & The City Reno 911! Related Ti Presento i Robinson (The Robinsons)
 Stella Last Man Standing Dentro la TV I Commedianti (Slings and Arrows)
 Everybody Hates Chris The War at Home Everybody Loves Raymond King of Queens Rules of Engagement Worst WeekVintage
 Pappa e Ciccia (Roseanne)
 Cheers Casa Keaton (Family Ties)
 Get Smart Adult Information La Strana Coppia (The Odd Couple)
 M*A*S*H Mork & Mindy Police Squad!Sports
 US Figure Skating''

References

External links
 

Comedy Central
Italian-language television stations
Telecom Italia Media
Television channels in Italy
Television channels and stations established in 2004